Pizzo Straciugo is a mountain of the Pennine Alps, located on the border between Switzerland and Italy. It lies east of the Portjengrat, on the range between the Val Divedro (Valais) and Domodossola (Piedmont).

References

External links
 Pizzo Straciugo on Hikr

Straciugo
Straciugo
Straciugo
Italy–Switzerland border
International mountains of Europe
Mountains of Valais
Two-thousanders of Switzerland